Randal C. Picker is an American legal scholar who is currently the James Parker Hall Distinguished Service Professor of Law at the University of Chicago Law School. He is an expert in antitrust law and intellectual property law. His areas of interest also include law and economics, regulated industries, and bankruptcy law.

Life and career

Picker graduated from the University of Chicago with a B.A. cum laude in 1980, majoring in economics. He was a member of Phi Beta Kappa. He continued his studies at Chicago and graduated with a M.A. as a Freidman fellow in 1982. In 1985, he graduated with a J.D. cum laude from the University of Chicago Law School, where he was an associate editor of the University of Chicago Law Review.

After graduating from law school, Picker clerked for Judge Richard A. Posner on the U.S. Court of Appeals for the Seventh Circuit. Between 1986 and 1999, he practised as an attorney at Sidley & Austin in Chicago, where he worked in the areas of debt restructuring and corporate reorganizations in bankruptcy.

Picker joined the faculty at the University of Chicago Law School in 1989. He has written in the areas of intellectual property, antitrust policy and regulated industries, and applications of game theory and agent-based computer simulations to the law. He teaches classes in antitrust law, network industries, secured transactions, and bankruptcy and corporate reorganizations.

References

American legal scholars
University of Chicago alumni
University of Chicago Law School alumni
Living people
University of Chicago Law School faculty
Year of birth missing (living people)